Hubert Lagardelle (8 July 1874 – 20 September 1958) was a pioneer of French revolutionary syndicalism. He regularly authored reviews for the Plans magazine, was co-founder of the journal Prélude, and Minister of Labour in the Vichy regime.

Revolutionary syndicalism 

Finishing his studies in Law with a thesis on trade unions, Hubert Lagardelle began his career in journalism by founding the Toulouse Marxist journal Socialist Youth (1895). In 1896 he became a member of the French Workers' Party (Marxist) of Jules Guesde. In 1899 he founded the Le Mouvement socialiste, a theoretical journal of socialism and syndicalism which remains a benchmark in the history of French socialism. Lagardelle took influence from the theories of Proudhon, Marx and Georges Sorel. As a socialist activist, he attended meetings of the General Confederation of Labour (CGT) and was a contributor to the development of the revolutionary syndicalist movement in the years 1904–1908.

Fascism and national syndicalism 

In 1910, disappointed with the evolution of the CGT, Lagardelle retired to Toulouse where he became responsible for the local chamber of commerce. Like many other contemporary French revolutionary unionists, such as Gustave Hervé and Georges Valois, he left the labour movement and developed a tendency towards fascism. In 1926, he joined the Toulouse section of the Faisceau, the first French fascist party. Benito Mussolini attributed the genesis of Fascism in part to Lagardelle, writing in his "Doctrine of Fascism" (1932): "In the great river of fascism, you will find that the veins run back to Sorel, Peguy, to the Lagardelle Socialist Movement and the Italian trade unionists, who from 1904 to 1914, carried a new note in socialist circles with Pagine libere Olivetti, La Lupa of Orano He Divenire Social E. Leone."

Vichy government and later life 

Fascinated by Italian fascism, Lagardelle assisted the Ambassador of France to Rome, Henry de Jouvenel, from 1932 to 1937 in an attempt to establish a Franco-Italian alliance to prevent further German expansionism.

Lagardelle became Minister of Labour for the Vichy government of Pierre Laval (April 1942 – November 1943). In 1943, he was forced to resign from the government and became editor of the Socialist France newspaper. In 1946, he was sentenced to life imprisonment but released because of his age in 1949.

He died on 20 September 1958.

Works 
 The Agrarian Question and Socialism (1899)
 The Evolution of Labour Unions in France (1900)
 Intellectuals to Socialism (1901)
 The Confederation of Labour and Socialism (1907)
 Unionism and Socialism (1908)
 The Socialist Party and the General Confederation of Labour, Paris, River, 1908.
 Bakunin and Marx, 1909, published in the International.
 Text and Comment letters of Georges Sorel Hubert Lagardelle, 1933, Rome.
 The Italian Fascist Regime, 1935 in the French Encyclopedia.
 Twenty years of history of Italy, 1937.
 The French Socialism.
 Rome Mission Mussolini, 1955.

Sources 
 Christine Bouneau, Hubert Lagardelle: un bourgeois révolutionnaire et son époque, 1996
 Zeev Sternhell, La droite révolutionnaire, 1885–1914, Seuil, 1978.
 Bernard-Henri Lévy, L'Idéologie française, Grasset, 1981.
 Simon Epstein, Les Dreyfusards sous l'Occupation, éd. Albin Michel, 2001.
 Lettres d'Hubert Lagardelle à Robert Michels (1903-1936), with introduction by Willy Gianinazzi

1874 births
1958 deaths
People from Haute-Garonne
French fascists
French collaborators with Nazi Germany
French socialists
National syndicalists
Former Marxists
French politicians convicted of crimes